The Highlands Current is a New York State weekly newspaper located in Cold Spring, New York. Currently owned and managed by a nonprofit corporation, Highlands Current Inc., the current publication was founded in 2010, and it "serves to provide readers a balanced reporting of news and events."

Edited by Chip Rowe, The Highlands Current provides two ways to access their news, through their official website and their print edition. Since its 2010 founding, it has won over 45 awards and has published over 8,000 articles. the office is located at 142 Main Street in Cold Spring.

History  
Highlands Current Inc. was founded in 2010 by Philipstown resident Gordon Stewart, under the name of Philipstown.Info, Inc. Originally providing readers news through their website, Stewart later expanded the corporation in 2012 to a print edition, called The Paper. In 2014, Stewart gathered a board of directors to officially establish a community-supported not-for-profit organization. Later that year, Stewart gave his position as publisher to the new board of the organization and died later that year.

In October 2015, the Internal Revenue Service confirmed the status of Philipstown.Info, Inc., as a tax-exempt nonprofit organization as described under section 501(c)(3) of the Internal Revenue Code. The organization was therefore eligible to receive contributions that were tax-deductible to the donor. The corporation was registered with the Charities Bureau in the Office of the New York State Attorney General and actively solicits contributions only within New York State. Furthermore, in May 2015, Philipstown.Info, Inc., became a member of the Institute for Nonprofit News. Its mission is “to provide education and business support services to our nonprofit member organizations and promote the value and benefit of public-service and investigative journalism”.

In April 2016, to reflect broadening coverage of Beacon and other neighboring towns, the newspaper was renamed The Highlands Current and the website, highlandscurrent.org. The corporation became Highlands Current Inc.

Coverage 
Every Friday, The Highlands Current publishes news to the Hudson River towns of Cold Spring, Garrison, and Beacon about Cold Spring, Beacon, Garrison, the Hudson Valley, Putnam County and Philipstown. It focuses on news covering business, community issues, crime, education, government, and social issues. The sections are further divided into sub-sections and provides readers with a  range of variety from local to national news. In addition, Highlands Current Inc. allows viewers to post free online ads for up to two weeks. These can include job offerings, criminal lists, and also allows people to post items for sale.

In addition, the paper includes an online archive section that has hundreds of articles dating back to 2012.

Awards 
At the National Newspaper Association’s 2017 Better Newspaper Contest  held in Norfolk, Virginia, The Highlands Current won seven national awards. Following these achievements, it won an additional 12 state awards in 2019. Since its first year of eligibility in 2013, The Highlands Current has won 45 NYPA awards. The following includes its achievements:

 1st Place, Best Business Stories Among Non-Daily Newspapers, Liz Schevtchuk Armstrong (2017) - National Newspaper Association's Better Newspaper Contest
 1st Place, Best Original Editorial Cartoon, Clay Jones "Shared Services" (2017) - National Newspaper Association's Better Newspaper Contest
1st Place, Feature Story Category for Non-Circulation, Michael Turton "A Day in Drug Court" (2017) - National Newspaper Association's Better Newspaper Contest
1st Place, Video Journalism, Greg Gunder "The World's Oldest Barber" (2017) - National Newspaper Association's Better Newspaper Contest
1st Place, In-Depth Recording for Circulation of 5,000 or Less, Chip Rowe "Fighting Back - The Opioid Crisis" (2018) - Annual Better Newspaper Contest by the New York Press Association
1st Place, Best News or Feature Series Among Newspapers with Circulations of 4,000 to 7,000, Chip Rowe "Hot Hot? How Soon? Climate Change in the Highlands" (2019) - Annual Better Newspaper Contest by the New York Press Association
1st Place, Best Environmental Coverage, Chip Rowe "Hot Hot? How Soon? Climate Change in the Highlands" (2019) - Annual Better Newspaper Contest  by the New York Press Association
1st Place, Feature-Story Division for Newspapers with Circulations of 4,000 to 6,000, Michael Turton "Were You Just Thinking We Should Do a Story on Coincidences?" (2019) - Annual Better Newspaper Contest by the New York Press Association
1st Place, Sports-Feature Division, Brian PJ Cronin "The Endless List" (2019) - Annual Better Newspaper Contest by the New York Press Association
2nd Place, Best News or Feature Series, Chip Rowe "Fighting Back - The Opioid Crisis" (2018) - Annual Better Newspaper Contest by the New York Press Association
2nd Place, In-Depth Reporting Among Papers with Circulations of 4,000 to 7,000, Chip Rowe "Hot Hot? How Soon? Climate Change in the Highlands" (2019) - Annual Better Newspaper Contest by the New York Press Association
2nd Place, In-Depth Reporting Among Papers with Circulations of 4,000 to 7,000, Brian PJ Cronin "Nice Guys Finish Last." (2019) - Annual Better Newspaper Contest by the New York Press Association
3rd Place, Best Advertisement, Kate Vikstorm (2017) - National Newspaper Association's Better Newspaper Contest
3rd Place, Feature Story Category for Non-Circulation "Off the Wall at Grey Printing" (2017) - National Newspaper Association's Better Newspaper Contest

See also 

 List of newspapers in the United States
 List of New York City newspapers and magazines

References 

Weekly newspapers published in the United States
Newspapers published in New York (state)
Newspapers established in 2010